The 2006–07 Toto Cup Leumit was the 18th time the cup was being contested. The final was played at Kiryat Eliezer Stadium on 13 February 2007.

The winners were Ironi Kiryat Shmona, beating Bnei Sakhnin on penalties in the final after a 1–1 after 120 minutes.

Group stage

Group A

Group B

Semifinals

Final

See also
 Toto Cup
 2006–07 Liga Leumit
 2006–07 in Israeli football

References

Leumit
Toto Cup Leumit
Israel Toto Cup Leumit